La Crescent may refer to:

 La Crescent, Minnesota, US, a city
 La Crescent Township, Houston County, Minnesota, US
 La Crescent (grape), a white grape varietal developed at the University of Minnesota

See also
 La Crescenta-Montrose, California, a census-designated place